Loćika may refer to:

 Loćika (Aleksinac), a village in Serbia
 Loćika (Rekovac), a village in Serbia